U.S. law provides for the declaration of selected public observances by the President of the United States as designated by Congress or by the discretion of the President. Generally the President will provide a statement about the purpose and significance of the observance, and call on the people of the United States to observe the day "with appropriate ceremonies and activities".  These events are typically to honor or commemorate a public issue or social cause, ethnic group, historic event or noted individual. However, (with several exceptions) there is no requirement that government or business close on these days, and many members of the general public may not be aware that such holidays even exist. Holidays proclaimed in this way may be considered a U.S. "national observance", but it would be improper to refer to them as "federal holidays". Many of these observances designated by Congress are authorized under permanent law under Title 36, U.S. Code, in which cases the President is under obligation to issue an annual proclamation.

In addition to annual commemorative events, the President may proclaim a day or period designated for mourning or prayer after the death of noted officials including U.S. Presidents and Chief Justices of the United States or after major tragic events or disasters with serious casualties.

The policy of issuing proclamations calling for the observance of special days or events is in 1 CFR Section 19.4, which allows for the responsibility for the preparation and presentation of proposed proclamations calling for the observance of special days, or events to the Director of Management and Budget to such agencies as deemed appropriate. Proposed proclamations shall be submitted at least 60 days in advance of the specified observance, with any approved commemorative proclamations transmitted to the President.

Annual special days recognized by presidential proclamation 

Bold text indicates a public holiday, on which most government agencies and major businesses are closed.

 January 16: Religious Freedom Day
 3rd Monday in January: Martin Luther King Jr. Federal Holiday
 3rd Sunday in January: National Sanctity of Human Life Day
 various March/April: Education and Sharing Day (based on Hebrew calendar)
February 15: Susan B. Anthony Day
March 10: Harriet Tubman Day
March 19: National Day of Honor
March 25: Greek Independence Day
March 29: National Vietnam War Veterans Day
March 31: Cesar Chavez Day
March 31: Transgender Day of Visibility
 April 6: National Tartan Day
2nd Thursday in April: National D.A.R.E. Day
April 9: National Former Prisoner of War Recognition Day
April 14: Pan American Day and Pan American Week
May 1: Loyalty Day
May 1: Law Day, U.S.A.
May 15: Peace Officers Memorial Day
1st Thursday in May: National Day of Prayer
2nd Friday in May: Military Spouse Day
2nd Sunday in May: Mother's Day
3rd Friday in May: National Defense Transportation Day and National Transportation Week
3rd Saturday in May: Armed Forces Day
May 22: National Maritime Day
May 25: National Missing Children's Day
last Monday in May: Memorial Day
1st Monday in June: National Child's Day
June 14: Flag Day and National Flag Week
June 19: Juneteenth
3rd Sunday in June: Father's Day
July 27: National Korean War Veterans Armistice Day
last Sunday in July: Parent's Day
August 16: National Airborne Day
August 26: Women's Equality Day
1st Monday in September: Labor Day
1st Sunday after Labor Day: National Grandparents' Day
weekend before September 11: National Days of Prayer and Remembrance
September 11: Patriot Day
September 11: Emergency Number Day
3rd Friday in September National POW/MIA Recognition Day
September 17: Constitution Day and Citizenship Day and Constitution Week
September 22: American Business Women's Day
September 28: National Good Neighbor Day
4th Monday in September: Family Day
last Sunday in September: Gold Star Mother's Day
1st Monday in October: Child Health Day
October 6: German-American Day
2nd Monday in October: Columbus Day
October 9: Leif Erikson Day
October 11: General Pulaski Memorial Day
October 15: White Cane Safety Day
October 24: United Nations Day
November 9: World Freedom Day
November 11: Veterans Day
November 15: National Philanthropy Day
November 15: America Recycles Day
4th Thursday in November: Thanksgiving Day
Friday after Thanksgiving: Native American Heritage Day
December 1: World AIDS Day
December 3: International Day of Persons with Disabilities
December 7: National Pearl Harbor Remembrance Day
December 10: Human Rights Day and Human Rights Week
December 15: Bill of Rights Day
December 17: Wright Brothers Day

Annual special weeks recognized by presidential proclamation 

1st week of March: Save Your Vision Week
3rd week of March: National Poison Prevention Week
last week of April: National Volunteer Week
varies in April: Crime Victims' Rights Week
varies in April: National Park Week
first week of May: Public Service Recognition Week
third week of May: World Trade Week
third week of May: National Hurricane Preparedness Week
week prior to Memorial Day: National Safe Boating Week
third week of July: Captive Nations Week
3rd week of September: National Farm Safety and Health Week
varies in September: National Historically Black Colleges and Universities Week
week of October 9: Fire Prevention Week
week of 2nd Sunday in October: National School Lunch Week
week of 3rd Sunday in October: National Forest Products Week
3rd week in October: National Character Counts Week
varies in October: Minority Enterprise Development Week
week prior to Thanksgiving: National Farm-City Week
week of Thanksgiving: National Family Week
August 16–22: National Employer Support of the Guard and Reserve Week

Annual special months recognized by presidential proclamation 

 January: National Mentoring Month
 January: Stalking Awareness Month
 January: Slavery and Human Trafficking Prevention Month
 February: American Heart Month
 February: Black History Month
 February: Teen Dating Violence Awareness Month
 March: American Red Cross Month
 March: Women's History Month
 March: Irish-American Heritage Month
 April: Cancer Control Month
 April: National Donate Life Month
 April: National Child Abuse Prevention Month
 April: National Sexual Assault Awareness Month
 April: National Financial Literacy Month
 May: Older Americans Month
 May: Jewish American Heritage Month
 May: Asian Pacific American Heritage Month
 May: Mental Health Awareness Month
 May: National Physical Fitness and Sports Month
 May: National Foster Care Month
 June: Gay and Lesbian Pride Month
 June: Caribbean-American Heritage Month
 June: Great Outdoors Month 
 June: National Oceans Month
 June: African-American Music Appreciation Month
 July: National Ice Cream Month
 September: National Childhood Cancer Awareness Month
 September: National Sickle Cell Awareness Month
 September: National Alcohol and Drug Addiction Recovery Month
 September: National Ovarian and Prostate Cancer Awareness Month
 September: National Wilderness Month
 September: National Preparedness Month
 September: National Childhood Obesity Awareness Month
 September: Prostate Cancer Awareness Month
 September 15 – October 15: National Hispanic Heritage Month
 October: National Information Literacy Awareness Month
 October: Italian-American Heritage and Culture Month
 October: Country Music Month 
 October: National Breast Cancer Awareness Month
 October: National Domestic Violence Awareness Month
 October: National Arts & Humanities Month
 October: National Disability Employment Awareness Month
 October: National Cyber Security Awareness Month
 October: National Energy Awareness Month
October:National Down Syndrome Awareness Month
 November: National Entrepreneurship Month
 November: Military Family Month
 November: National Bone Marrow Donor Awareness Month
 November: National Hospice Month
 November: National Adoption Month
 November: National Family Caregivers Month
 November: National Alzheimer's Disease Awareness Month
 November: National Diabetes Month
 November: National American Indian Heritage Month
 November: National Critical Infrastructure Protection Month
 December: National Impaired Driving Prevention Month

Defunct observances
The following observances have been mandated or authorized by Congress or the President, but are no longer proclaimed or observed on a regular basis.

 March 21 (1982-1988): Afghanistan Day
 June 14 (1982–1992): Baltic Freedom Day
 June 25, 1987: National Catfish Day
 October 6, 1972: National Coaches Day

See also 
 Public holidays in the United States
 Federal holidays in the United States
 Presidential Proclamation
 List of month-long observances

Notes

External links 
 United States Code Title 36, Subtitle I, Part A, Chapter 1: Patriotic and National Observances
 Presidential Proclamations Project, University of Houston
 Proclamations from Washington to Obama (1789-present) at the American Presidency Project

Observances
 
United States by presidential proclamation